Sherbrooke is a settlement in Victoria, Australia, 35 km east of Melbourne, located within the Shire of Yarra Ranges local government area.

Permanent European settlement began with Robert W. Graham, an ex sea captain (born 1836 in Ludlow, Shropshire England) who spent eight years living in Quebec, Canada, before migrating to Australia with his family. He built a small house , hand-cut from the forest, using horizontal-slab wall construction, an adobe floor, weatherboards and a sapling/shingle roof. Now noted as the 'father of Sherbrooke', Graham named the area after Sherbrooke the location near his place of residence in Canada. He is also credited with discovering Sherbrooke Falls, originally named Graham falls. He was the first Post Master of Sherbrooke, the position he held from 1894 until his death in 1918. A rough hut at the back of the house, with a delivery slot cut in the door, served as the first post office. Both the house and the post office building still stand.

In March 2019, “Burnham Beeches”, a 1930s art deco property owned by celebrity chef Shannon Bennett, was transformed into an art installation by street artist Rone aka Tyrone Wright. Originally the home of industrialist Alfred Nicholas and his family, it later served as a research facility, a children's hospital, and a luxury hotel. It is again slated for conversion into a luxury hotel, beginning in mid-2019.

Flora
Sherbrooke Forest, a cool temperate rainforest, is listed as endangered and is protected by the state's Flora and Fauna Guarantee Act. It is a habitat of the tallest flowering plant in the world, Mountain Ash (Eucalyptus regnans), which can exceed 100 metres in height.

Fauna
Sherbrooke Forest has populations of swamp wallabies, wombats, platypus, echidnas and several species of possums and gliders. It is also a habitat of the lyrebird. Other birds found in the area include Galahs, Long-billed and Little Corellas, Australian King-Parrots, Crimson Rosellas and Sulphur-crested Cockatoos.

References

Yarra Ranges